Reg (Khanashin) District is situated in the southeastern part of Helmand Province, Afghanistan along the Helmand River on its western bank. The population is 25,600 (80% Pashtun and 20% Balouch). The main village is Khanashin.

The district is almost a desert and all the villages are along the Helmand River. The drought has extremely affected this district and its agriculture is ruined. The unemployment rate is 80%.

Agriculture
Actually, the district is known as the "Green Zone" due to its abundance of vegetation.  Due to irrigation controlled by the Helmand and Arghandab Valley Authority the Helmand River feeds into many canals that wind through the surrounding villages and bring water to this once desolate area, allowing local farmers to grow crops ranging from corn, okra, wheat, poppy, and marijuana.  The unemployment rate is below 20% due to the surge in American troops in the region, bringing much needed safety and stability, allowing locals to move back into the area and re-open once flourishing business.

History
Reg District was, for much of the Afghan War, under Taliban control, until it was taken by ISAF forces in July 2009 during Operation Khanjar.

Natural Resources
Geologists also discovered rare earth minerals and niobium deposits in the Khanneshin area of Southern Helmand province with an estimated value of more than $89 billion

References

External links
 Map of Settlements AIMS, May 2002

Districts of Helmand Province